Ansiba Hassan is an Indian actress, television anchor and dancer. Her first role was in the 2013 Tamil film Paranjothi, directed by Gobu Balaji. Her popularity grew as a result of her appearance in Jeethu Joseph's 2013 hit Malayalam movie Drishyam where she played the part of Anju, the daughter of an ordinary cable TV operator.

Early life 
Ansiba was born 18 June 1992, the eldest of six children born to parents Hassan and Rasiya in the Calicut district of Kerala, India. She has 3 younger brothers Ashik, Asib, Afsal and a younger sister Afsana.
She completed her graduation in BSc Visual Communication.

Filmography

Television

References

External links 
 

1992 births
21st-century Indian actresses
Actresses from Kozhikode
Actresses in Malayalam cinema
Actresses in Tamil cinema
Indian film actresses
Living people
Indian women television presenters
Child actresses in Malayalam cinema